The M26 is a fragmentation hand grenade developed by the United States military.  It entered service around 1952 and was used in combat during the Korean War.  Its distinct lemon shape led it to being nicknamed the "lemon grenade" (compare the Russian F1 grenade and American Mk 2 "pineapple" grenade, with similar nicknames).

Fragmentation is enhanced by a special notched fragmentation coil that lies along the inside of the grenade's body. This coil had a circular cross-section in the M26 grenade and an improved square cross-section in the M26A1 and later designs.

The grenades were stored inside two-part cylindrical fiberboard shipping tubes (Container M289) and were packed 25 or 30 to a crate.

History 

The M26 was developed as a result of studies on the Mk 2. Unlike its previous counterpart, its M204A1 fuse creates no tell-tale smoke or sparks when ignited and its powder train is almost silent while it burns down. Its Composition B filler was considered safer than the flaked or granular TNT filling used in the Mk 2.

The M26 series was created after World War II to meet criticisms of the Mk 2. The original M26 replaced the Mk 2 Fragmentation Grenade as Army standard issue in Korea. Massive World War II production left the Mk 2 as limited standard issue with the US Army and US Marines throughout the 1960s and the US Navy until the 1970s.  The M26A1 / M61 was the primary fragmentation grenade used by American forces in the Vietnam War.

The M26 series (M26/M61/M57) was replaced by the M33 series grenade (M33/M67) at the end of the Vietnam War.

Variants

M26A1
The M26A1 is an M26 that has the fragmentation coil redesigned to have a square rather than circular cross-section and has deeper serrations to aid in fragmentation. It also added a small tetryl booster charge on its fuze to completely detonate the explosive filler (displaced to  because of the added booster charge) and used the updated M204A2 fuze. It was adopted in American service in 1958.

M26A2
The M26A2 is an M26A1 modified to accept an M217 impact fuze. It is slightly fatter than the M26A1 and the safety lever is embossed with the word "IMPACT" on it. Earlier models had a red-painted lever with the word "IMPACT" painted on with black paint.

M30
The M30 is the practice version of the M26 grenade. It had a cast-iron two-piece oval body with a plastic base plug. The body was embossed with the symbols "RFX55"; it was originally the basis for an experimental hand grenade that was never put into production. It had a filler of 21 grains of black powder and used the M10A3/M10A4 or M204A1/M204A2 series of fuzes. Its body is painted light blue with a brown band across the middle. When the grenade detonated, the overpressure made the plug pop out and released a plume of black smoke caused by the burnt filler.

M61

The M61 is the M26A1 with an extra safety (called the "jungle clip") attached to the safety lever. This is to prevent the safety lever from flying off and allowing the striker to function if the safety pin gets accidentally pulled out by snagging it on jungle vegetation.

The most common method of carrying grenades was by straps on the ammo pouches. Soldiers, inspired by characters in movies and TV shows, also commonly hung grenades on their persons using the safety levers, although it is said that "official policy forbade the practice as unsafe."

M62
The M62 is the practice version of the M26A1  / M61, but with a larger  fuze well. Its body and lever are painted blue to identify it as a practice grenade and it has a "jungle clip" like the M61.

M50
The M50 was a "live fire" conversion of the M30 Practice grenade for use on training ranges. It sealed the base plug, used the M204A1 fuze, and replaced the low-explosive black powder filler with high-explosive Composition B. It allowed the training of recruits with greater safety because it lacked the fragmentation coil of the M26 and had a smaller blast radius. This also used up obsolete ordnance by utilizing worn M30 bodies as its base.

M56
The M56 is the M26A1 with a larger 5/8-inch fuze well. It uses the M215 detonating fuse (with a delay of 4–5 seconds) and has a "jungle clip" like the M61. The M215 is similar to the M213 fuse used in the M33-series grenades except it has a curved lever rather than the bent straight lever of the M213.

M57
The M57 is the M26A2 with a "jungle clip" safety attached to the lever.

L2 (United Kingdom)

The L2 series (with a green shell) is the British version of the M26; it has a 4.4 second fuze. The L2 was like the early M26 (except it used the L25 series fuze), the L2A1 was like the product-improved M26A1, and the L2A2 was a variant of the L2A1 with a redesigned fuze well for ease of mass production. The L3 series (with a light blue shell and a black powder filler) is the Practice grenade variant. The L4 series (with a dark blue shell, non-functional fuze, and no filler) is the inert Drill grenade variant.

DM41 (West Germany)

The DM41 or DM41A1 is a West German copy of the M26A1 hand grenade, manufactured by Diehl Defence of Nuremberg. Production ended around 1975 when the DM51 explosive fragmentation hand grenade was adopted by the Bundeswehr.

Users
: Australia adopted the M26, but it has been replaced by the F1 grenade.
: Used by the Brazilian Army.
: Canada adopted the M61, but it has since been replaced by the C13 grenade, a Canadian-made version of the M67 grenade.
: Used by the Colombian Army. Produced by Military Industry of Colombia.
: Used by the West German Bundeswehr until the DM51 grenade was adopted circa 1975.
: The M26A2 was adopted in Israel as the M26, and is still in use in that country. Its variant added an improved safety fuze in 2012, aimed to ensure the grenade will not explode if struck by an enemy bullet.
: British L2 series supplied to Nigerian government forces during the Nigerian Civil War.
: Used by North Korean Special forces.
: Used by Armed Forces of the Philippines and Philippine National Police-Special Action Force 
: Portugal adopted the M26A1 and produced it under license as the M312.
: South African M26 grenades supplied to the Rwandan government in October 1992.
: South Africa produced the M963, itself a variant of the Portuguese M312, under license. Production would later comprise a copy of the standard M26 grenade designated as the M26 HE Hand Grenade, a blue training version with a reusable aluminium body designated as the M26 Practice Hand Grenade, and an inert training version designated as the M26 Drill Hand Grenade, with these designs remaining in production and in South African military and police service.
: South Vietnam received the M26 grenade as US aid. Production and sales of the M26 continued to South Vietnam even after the US military adopted the M26A1 / M61 and M33 / M67.
: The L2 series replaced the M36 Mills Bomb in British service. It was replaced by the L109A1 grenade during the 2000s.
: The M26 was introduced during the Korean War. It was limited standard issue at the beginning of the Vietnam War and was soon replaced by the M26A1 / M61 (1958), M26A2 / M57 (1960), and M33 / M67 (1968) as standard issue.

References

External links
Pictures of the M26
Overview of the M61
Picture of the M26A2
Accidental M26 hand grenade blast injuries in the Transkei region of South Africa: A case report

Hand grenades of the United States
Fragmentation grenades
Military equipment introduced in the 1950s